The Mind Robber is the second serial of the sixth season of the British science fiction television series Doctor Who, which was first broadcast in five weekly parts from 14 September to 12 October 1968.

The serial is set outside of time and space in a world where fictional characters and mythological creatures including Medusa and the Minotaur exist. In the serial, the English fiction writer "the Master" (Emrys Jones) tries to recruit the time traveller the Second Doctor (Patrick Troughton) to replace the Master's role as the creative power in this realm because of the Master's advancing age.

Plot
After defeating the Dominators and starting off a volcanic eruption, the Doctor, Jamie and Zoe find themselves and the TARDIS in the path of a lava flow. Upon trying to dematerialise out of the way, the TARDIS experiences a fault in the fluid link. At the insistence of Zoe and Jamie, the Doctor uses an emergency unit that takes the TARDIS into another dimension outside of reality. Upon their arrival into an empty white void, the travellers find themselves assaulted, first subtly then overtly, by an unseen force. The attack results in the TARDIS breaking apart and the travellers being scattered.

The Doctor, after experiencing a series of curious encounters, manages to find Jamie and Zoe. He soon deduces that they are in a world filled with fictional and mythological characters. They finally meet a person called "The Master" who seems to be in charge. It turns out that he is in fact an Earth man abducted and brought to the land of fiction in order to provide creative energies for the unseen aliens who are really in charge. Everything that the Doctor has experienced was a series of tests to prepare him for his role as replacement. The aliens' plan is to control everyone on Earth and bring them to the land of fiction, leaving the Earth itself empty for easy colonisation.

The Doctor, Jamie, and Zoe manage to foil the aliens' plans and to rescue the Master, freeing him of his mind control. As the central computer is destroyed, the Doctor hypothesises that everyone will be returned whence they came. In the end, the Doctor, Jamie, Zoe and the Master fade out of the world of fiction and the TARDIS appears to reform itself.

Production

Working titles for this story included Man Power, Another World and The Fact of Fiction. The Mind Robber was originally composed of four episodes, but the preceding serial, The Dominators, was reduced from six to five episodes. This resulted in a sparse first episode being written, as they had to use the limited budget of the replaced episode. This stretching of the story also resulted in the first four episodes only running between 19 and 22 minutes in length, and Episode 5 being the shortest Doctor Who episode ever at slightly over 18 minutes.

During production, actor Frazer Hines contracted chickenpox and was hurriedly replaced by Hamish Wilson for episode 2.  This also meant that a scene had to quickly be written to explain Jamie's sudden change in appearance. On both occasions before Jamie gets turned into a cut-out, he shouts, "creag an tuire". Frazer Hines joked on the DVD commentary that this is Scottish Gaelic for "vodka and tonic". It is close to the MacLaren clan's slogan "" ("the rock of the boar").

Location filming for The Mind Robber took place in June 1968 at Harrison's Rocks in Sussex and Kenley Aerodrome in Croydon. Other filming took place in the same month in Ealing Studios, while studio recording for episodes one and two also took place in June. Studio recording for episodes three, four, and five took place in July 1968. The white robots that close in on Jamie and Zoe in the void outside the TARDIS had been loaned from a previous use in the British science fiction television series Out of the Unknown.

Cast notes

Bernard Horsfall later played a Time Lord in The War Games (1969), Taron in Planet of the Daleks (1973) and Chancellor Goth in The Deadly Assassin (1976), all were directed by David Maloney. He also played Arnold Baynes in the audio play Davros.  Christopher Robbie appeared in Revenge of the Cybermen (1975), playing the Cyberleader. Ian Hines, who plays one of the soldiers, is the brother of Frazer Hines.

Broadcast and reception

Although a caption at the end of Episode 5 advertised The Invasion for the next week, it would be three weeks before it was broadcast due to the BBC's coverage of the 1968 Summer Olympics. The story was repeated on BBC2 on consecutive Fridays from 31 January – 28 February 1992, achieving viewing figures of 2.57, 2.64, 1.5, 1.5 and 3.46 million respectively.

The BBC's Audience Research Report showed a mostly negative reaction from viewers, with "just under a third" reacting favourably. The complaints mainly were around the story being more fantasy-orientated rather than the more dignified science fiction, making it seem "silly". Others liked the concept, but felt it was too complicated for children.

Paul Cornell, Martin Day, and Keith Topping wrote of the serial in The Discontinuity Guide (1995), "The combination of disturbing images (Jamie having his face taken away), superb literalism ('When is a door not a door?') and set pieces (the mental battle for control of Jamie and Zoe) makes this one of the most memorable stories of the era." In The Television Companion (1998), David J. Howe and Stephen James Walker praised the story's inventiveness, stating that it "remains a hugely enjoyable story, and one that stands up to repeated viewing". However, they said that the various characters that did not contribute much made the story "a bit of a jumble", and the fact that the serial was elongated by an episode had added padding. Howe and Walker also felt that the story went "downhill" after the "wonderful" first episode. In 2009, Mark Braxton of Radio Times praised the story's "brave" premise and its "delightful" but subtle humour. He also wrote that the inhabitants of the Land of Fiction were "well cast", despite being "middle-class" and "bookish". The A.V. Club reviewer Christopher Bahn described it as "one of the series' most genre-breaking and forward-thinking stories", with the various elements "creepy and frightening" rather than played for camp. While he noted the confusion of where reality ended and the Land of Fiction began and the ambiguous ending that did not seem to affirm if they had escaped it or not, Bahn felt that it had a "weird effect" of strengthening the theme of the danger being the Doctor's ongoing story. In 2010, Charlie Jane Anders of io9 listed the cliffhanger to the first episode — in which the TARDIS breaks apart — as one of the greatest cliffhangers in the history of Doctor Who.

Commercial releases

In print

A novelisation of this serial, written by Peter Ling, was published by Target Books in November 1986.

Home media

The Mind Robber was released on VHS in May 1990 and released on Region 2 DVD on 7 March 2005, and in North America on 6 September 2005.

Critical analysis 

A book length study of the serial, written by Andrew Hickey, was published as part of The Black Archive series from Obverse Books in 2016.

The serial was covered in volume 13 of the Doctor Who: The Complete History book series, which reprinted Andrew Pixley's 'Archive' features from Doctor Who Magazine and the various Doctor Who Magazine Special Editions, as well as new articles created specifically for the book.

References

External links

Doctor Who Locations – The Mind Robber

Target novelisation

Doctor Who serials novelised by Peter Ling
Second Doctor serials
1968 British television episodes
Television series based on Arthurian legend
Classical mythology in popular culture
Gulliver's Travels
Television shows based on The Three Musketeers
Metafictional television episodes
Rapunzel
Television shows based on fairy tales
Cultural depictions of Blackbeard
Cultural depictions of Medusa
Works based on Cyrano de Bergerac (play)